Zoom TV is a Polish television channel, launched on October 25, 2016.

Programming 
On the programming schedule consists of programs prepared by the local cable televisions, associated in the Polish Chamber of Electronic Communication (PIKE), magazines created for the web portal Onet.pl, and also movies, TV series and documentaries.

Series 
 Weeds (Trawka)
 Those Who Kill (Zabójcy)
 Ezel
 Pippi Longstocking (Pippi Langstrumpf)

Magazines 
 Bliżej! Magazyn reporterów (More closely! Reporters magazine) - hosted by Elżbieta Grzeszczuk-Chętko (TV Toya) and Dariusz Milejczak (WTK)
 Obywatel Kuźniar (Citizen Kuźniar) - talk-show, hosted by Jarosław Kuźniar (Onet.pl)
 Subiektywny (Subjective) - current affairs program, hosted by Bartosz Węglarczyk (Onet.pl)
 Na czasie (Trendy) - program about business and high-tech, hosted by Łukasz Grass (Onet.pl)

Documentary series/reality shows 
 Hoarders (Mania chomikowania)
 My Crazy Ex (Kocha, lubi, prześladuje)
 Best in Bridal (Bitwa na suknie ślubne)

Entertainment 
 Miło/ść (Lo/ve) - talk-show about marriages, hosted by Piotr Najsztub
 Świat według Jachimka (The World According to Jachimek) - satirical program, hosted by Tomasz Jachimek (Onet.pl)

References

External links
 Official Site 

Television channels in Poland
Television channels and stations established in 2016